Jerry Wright may refer to:

Jerry Wright at Heart Kent
Jerry Wright (ice hockey), Canadian ice hockey player chosen in 1969 NHL Amateur Draft#Round five

See also
Jeremy Wright (disambiguation)
Gerry Wright (disambiguation)
Gerard Wright
Gerald Wright (disambiguation)
Jeremiah Wright, pastor